Dr. William Otis Faxon (October 24, 1853 – November 12, 1942) served in the Massachusetts Senate and the Massachusetts House of Representatives.

Biography
William Otis Faxon was born in Stoughton, Massachusetts on October 24, 1843. He graduated from the Boston University School of Medicine in 1876.

He married Susan Reed Wales on July 10, 1878, and they had one son. She died in 1914.

A Republican, Faxon served in the Massachusetts House of Representatives from 1905 to 1906, and in the State Senate from 1907 to 1908.

He died in Boston on November 12, 1942.

References

1853 births
1942 deaths
American physicians
Boston University School of Medicine alumni
Republican Party Massachusetts state senators
Republican Party members of the Massachusetts House of Representatives
People from Stoughton, Massachusetts